Darakuyeh (also Romanized as Dārākūyeh and Dārkūyeh; also known as Darāku, Dārākubeh, and Deh Kooyeh) is a village in Qarah Bulaq Rural District, Sheshdeh and Qarah Bulaq District, Fasa County, Fars Province, Iran. At the 2006 census, its population was 968, in 226 families.

References 

Populated places in Fasa County